"Wasted on You" is a song by American country music singer Morgan Wallen, released to country radio on March 7, 2022, as the fourth single and final single from his 2021 album Dangerous: The Double Album. Wallen wrote the song with Ryan Vojtesak, Ernest Keith Smith, and Josh Thompson. Before its release as a single, "Wasted on You" topped the Billboard Hot Country Songs chart at the time of the album's release in January 2021.

History and content
Wallen debuted "Wasted on You" on January 11, 2021, as part of an acoustic set released on YouTube in advance of the album's release. In this acoustic set, he performed the song with his touring band: drummer Mark Annino, bassist Luke Rice, and guitarists Tyler Tomlinson and Dominic Frost. Wallen wrote the song with Ernest K. Smith, Josh Thompson, and Ryan Vojtseak.

Critical reception
Owen Myers of Pitchfork stated that the song is "a blend of trap snares and guitar twang that isn’t quite as fluid as the country/hip-hop hybrids of, say, [Sam] Hunt." Pip Ellwood-Hughes thought that the song had a "modern" sound, contrasting it with Wallen's collaboration with Diplo on "Heartless".

Chart performance
"Wasted on You" debuted at number one on the Billboard Hot Country Songs chart dated the week ending January 23, 2021, alongside the album tracks "Somebody's Problem", "Warning", and "Sand in My Boots" and the singles "7 Summers" and "More Than My Hometown". In doing so, Wallen became the first artist ever to chart six songs within the top ten of Hot Country Songs at the same time. The song's debut at the top of the chart coincided with Dangerous: The Double Album debuting at the number-one position on the Top Country Albums chart, making Wallen the first ever artist to debut at the top of both charts simultaneously. Furthermore, it was Wallen's second debut at the top, making him the first artist to have multiple songs debut at number one on the country chart. "Wasted on You" also debuted at number 9 on the Billboard Hot 100.

Charts

Weekly charts

Year-end charts

Certifications

Release history

References

2021 songs
2022 singles
Morgan Wallen songs
Songs written by Morgan Wallen
Songs written by Josh Thompson (singer)
Songs written by Ernest (musician)
Song recordings produced by Joey Moi
Big Loud singles
Republic Records singles
Billboard Hot Country Songs number-one singles of the year